The Tulane Green Wave women's basketball team represents Tulane University in NCAA Division I college baseball. The team competes in the American Athletic Conference. They play home games on campus in Devlin Fieldhouse, the 9th-oldest active basketball venue in the nation. The team's last appearance in the NCAA Division I women's basketball tournament was in 2015.

History
Tulane's women's basketball program has found continuous success under Lisa Stockton, who began coaching at Tulane in 1995. That year, Stockton led the team to its first NCAA Tournament appearance and was named Metro Conference Coach of the Year. That first appearance began a string of 9 consecutive NCAA Tournament berths. The team earned regular-season C-USA championships 4 times, the last in the 2009–10 season, when they finished with a 23–6 record (14–2 in C-USA). In addition, the program won the C-USA tournament 5 times: 1996–97, 1998–99, 1999–2000, 2000–01, and 2009–10. Lisa Stockton was twice named C-USA Coach of the Year (2006–07 and 2009–10).

2006–07 seniors Jami Montagnino (ranked 5th in NCAA Division I teams in free-throw percentage) and D'Aundra Henry proved essential to the team's success, both hitting 1,000 points for their careers in that season. That team was upset by Rice 64–52 in the C-USA semifinals in Tulsa, Oklahoma, and did not receive an at-large bid to the 2007 NCAA Tournament. With a final record of 25–6, they became the first team with 25 or more wins and six or fewer losses not to make it into the 64-team bracket, along with a 26–3 Montana team. Following a 62–53 win over UAB in the 2010 C-USA Tournament Final, the team advanced to the NCAA Tournament for the first time since 2003. During the 2011–12 season, senior Brett Benzio became the second female and third Tulane basketball player ever to reach 1,000 points and 1,000 rebounds in a season.

Team achievements

Yearly records

Postseason tournament appearances
Under Lisa Stockton, the Green Wave have appeared in 18 postseason tournaments.

NCAA Tournaments

Women's National Invitation Tournaments

Green Wave in professional basketball
The following Green Wave players have played in the WNBA:
Janell Burse
Grace Daley
Barbara Farris
Teana Miller
 Gwen Slaughter

References

External links